Juan Gardeazábal Garay (27 November 1923 – 21 December 1969) was a Spain referee.

He served as a referee in three FIFA World Cups (1958, 1962, and 1966), in which he directed a total of seven games as the main referee and six as a linesman.

He was also selected to referee at the 1970 FIFA World Cup  in Mexico, but he died a few months before the event.

References

External links
 

1923 births
1969 deaths
Spanish football referees